Lal Matir Sorane or Lala Matir Sarane is a 2003 Bengali song album of Silajit Majumder. This album was manufactured and marketed by Sagarika Musics Pvt Ltd.

Tracks 
 Side 1
 
 
 
 

 Side 2

References

External links 
 Songs in official website

Bengali-language songs
2003 albums
Silajit Majumder albums
Silajit Majumder songs